Emily Remler (September 18, 1957 – May 4, 1990) was an American jazz guitarist, active from the late 1970s until her death in 1990.

Early life and influences
Born in Englewood Cliffs, New Jersey, Remler began guitar at age ten. She listened to pop and rock guitarists like Jimi Hendrix and Johnny Winter. At the Berklee College of Music in the 1970s, she listened to jazz guitarists Charlie Christian, Wes Montgomery, Herb Ellis, Pat Martino, and Joe Pass.

Career
Remler settled in New Orleans, where she played in blues and jazz clubs, working with bands such as Four Play and Little Queenie and the Percolators before beginning her recording career in 1981. She was praised by jazz guitarist Herb Ellis, who referred to her as "the new superstar of guitar" and introduced her at the Concord Jazz Festival in 1978.

In a 1982 interview with People magazine, she said: "I may look like a nice Jewish girl from New Jersey, but inside I'm a 50-year-old, heavy-set black man with a big thumb, like Wes Montgomery."

Her first album as a band leader, Firefly, gained positive reviews, as did Take Two and Catwalk. She recorded Together with guitarist Larry Coryell. She participated in the Los Angeles version of Sophisticated Ladies from 1981 to 1982 and toured for several years with Astrud Gilberto. She also made two guitar instruction videos.

In 1985, she won Guitarist of the Year in Down Beat magazine's international poll. In 1988, she was artist in residence at Duquesne University and the next year received the Distinguished Alumni award from Berklee. Bob Moses, the drummer on Transitions and Catwalk, said, "Emily had that loose, relaxed feel. She swung harder and simpler. She didn't have to let you know that she was a virtuoso in the first five seconds."

Remler married Jamaican jazz pianist Monty Alexander in 1981; the marriage ended in 1984. Thereafter, she had a brief relationship with Coryell following her first divorce.

Her first guitar was her brother's Gibson ES-330. She played a Borys B120 hollow-body electric towards the end of the 1980s. Her acoustic guitars included a 1984 Collectors Series Ovation and a nylon-string Korocusci classical guitar that she used for bossa nova.

When asked how she wanted to be remembered she remarked, "Good compositions, memorable guitar playing and my contributions as a woman in music...but the music is everything, and it has nothing to do with politics or the women's liberation movement."

Death

Remler bore the scars of her longstanding opioid addiction, which is believed to have contributed to her death. In May, 1990, she died of heart failure at the age of 32 at the Connells Point home of musician Ed Gaston, while on tour in Australia.

Remler is buried in Block 4, Row 2, Grave 18 (Section 2, Field of Ephron) at New Montefiore Cemetery, New York.

Tributes

The album Just Friends: A Gathering in Tribute to Emily Remler, Volume 1 (Justice Records JR#0502-2) was released in 1990, and Volume 2 (JR#0503-2) followed in 1991. Performers from these two albums included guitarists Herb Ellis, Leni Stern, Marty Ashby, and Steve Masakowski; bassists Eddie Gómez, Lincoln Goines, and Steve Bailey; drummer Marvin "Smitty" Smith; pianists Bill O'Connell and David Benoit; and saxophonist Nelson Rangell, among others.
	
David Benoit wrote the song "6-String Poet", from his album Inner Motion (GRP, 1990), as a tribute to Remler.

The 1995 book Madame Jazz: Contemporary Women Instrumentalists by Leslie Gourse includes a posthumous chapter on Remler, based on interviews conducted while she was alive.

In 2002, West Coast guitarist Skip Heller recorded with his quartet a song called "Emily Remler" in her memory, released as track #5 on his record Homegoing (Innova Recordings).

Jazz guitarist Sheryl Bailey's 2010 album A New Promise was a tribute to Emily Remler.  Aged 18, Bailey first saw Remler perform, at the University of Pittsburgh Jazz Festival in 1984 - she was inspired to take her own guitar studies. Bailey said "She paved the way for me.... I really wanted to hear Emily's person in me when I played. It meant a lot to me to do this tribute and pay homage to her and to say thank you."  On the album, Bailey collaborated with Pittsburgh's Three Rivers Jazz Orchestra and producer Marty Ashby on eight tracks, including three composed by Remler ("East to Wes", "Mocha Spice", and "Carenia").

Discography

As leader/co-leader

Backing musician appearances

Compilations
 1991: Retrospective, Volume One: Standards (Concord)
 1991: Retrospective, Volume Two: Compositions (Concord)

Videos
 1990: Bebop and Swing Guitar (VHS, reissued on DVD in 2008)
 1990: Advanced Jazz and Latin Improvisation (VHS, reissued on DVD in 2008)

References

External links

Emily Remler (in Dutch)
Emily Remler Guitar Tabs
Emily Remler: a musical remembrance

1957 births
1990 deaths
American jazz guitarists
Women jazz guitarists
Jewish American musicians
Hard bop guitarists
Jazz fusion guitarists
People from Englewood Cliffs, New Jersey
Musicians from New Jersey
Berklee College of Music alumni
Jewish jazz musicians
20th-century American guitarists
Burials at New Montefiore Cemetery
20th-century American women guitarists
20th-century American Jews